Sony Entertainment, Inc. is the umbrella entertainment division of Japanese multinational conglomerate Sony and managed by its American subsidiary, established in 2012 to over see the corporation's ventures in film, television and music.

History
On 30 March 2012, then-co-chairman and CEO of Sony Pictures, Michael Lynton, and executive vice president and general counsel of Sony, Nicole Seligman, were respectively named as CEO and president of Sony Corporation of America to oversee all of Sony's global entertainment businesses. On 9 April 2013, Lynton renewed his contract with Sony and was elevated to the presidency at Sony Entertainment.

On 18 February, 2016, Seligman resigned after a decade and half with the company but remained there until March 31.

On 13 January 2017, Lynton announced that he was stepping down as CEO of Sony Entertainment and Sony Pictures and chairman of the latter to become chairman for Snap Inc. and was later replaced by Sony Pictures chairman and CEO Anthony Vinciquerra on 11 May 2017.

News outlets including The New York Post, Complete Music Update and TheStreet reported on 19 December 2016 about Sony was considering a restructuring of its American operations by merging Sony Pictures with Sony Interactive Entertainment which would have placed Sony Pictures under Sony Interactive's then-CEO, Andrew House, though House wouldn't have taken over day-to-day operations of Sony Pictures. However, a Sony spokesperson denounced any sort of planned merger or restructuring of any of the Sony media divisions at that time in an interview with the latter source.

Sony announced a merger of Sony Music Entertainment and Sony/ATV Music Publishing to form the umbrella "Sony Music Group" on 17 July 2019 and was finalized on August 1. On 10 February 2021, Sony/ATV Music Publishing reverted to rebranding as Sony Music Publishing.

Subsidiary companies

Sony Pictures Entertainment

 Sony Pictures Motion Picture Group (Film)
 Columbia Pictures
 TriStar Pictures
 TriStar Productions
 Sony Pictures Classics
 Screen Gems
 Sony Pictures Animation
 Sony Pictures Imageworks
 3000 Pictures
 Sony Pictures Releasing
 Sony Pictures Worldwide Acquisitions
 Destination Films
 Stage 6 Films
 Affirm Films
 Sony Pictures Home Entertainment
 Sony Wonder
 Genius Brands (equity stake)

 Crunchyroll, LLC (Anime; co-owned with Sony Music Entertainment Japan's Aniplex)
 Crunchyroll UK and Ireland
 Madman Anime
 Crunchyroll EMEA
 Crunchyroll SAS
 Crunchyroll SA
 Crunchyroll GmbH
 Crunchyroll Studios
 Crunchyroll Games, LLC
 Right Stuf
 Nozomi Entertainment
 5 Points Pictures
 RightStufAnime.com

 Sony Pictures Television (Television)
 Sony Pictures Television Studios
 Califon Productions, Inc.
 Jeopardy Productions, Inc.
 2waytraffic
 CPT Holdings, Inc.
 TriStar Television
 Affirm Television
 Embassy Row
 Starling Productions
 Huaso
 Teleset (50%)
 Fable Pictures
 Floresta
 Left Bank Pictures
 Stellify Media
 Curio Pictures
 Sony Pictures Television Kids
 Eleventh Hour Films
Bad Wolf (majority stake)
Sony Pictures Television - Nonfiction
19 Entertainment
B17 Entertainment
Sharp Entertainment
This Machine Filmworks
This Radicle Act
The Intellectual Property Corporation (IPC)
Maxine Entertainment
Trilogy Films
House of NonFiction
 Pixomondo

Sony Music Group 

 Sony Music Entertainment
 Columbia Records
 Epic Records
 RCA Records
 Arista Records
 The Orchard

 Sony Music Publishing
 EMI Music Publishing
 APM Music
 Extreme Music
 Hickory Records
 KPM Music
 AWAL

References

External links
 Sony Pictures website
 Sony Music website
 Sony Music Publishing website

Sony subsidiaries
2012 establishments in New York City
American companies established in 2012
Companies based in New York City
Mass media companies established in 2012